Icantí is a town in the Kuna de Madungandí province of Panama.

Sources 
World Gazeteer: Panama – World-Gazetteer.com

Populated places in Kuna de Madugandí